Sarah Deer (born November 9, 1972) is a Native American lawyer and professor of Women, Gender, and Sexuality studies and Public Affairs and Administration at the University of Kansas. She was a 2014 MacArthur fellow and has been inducted into the National Women's Hall of Fame. She advocates on behalf of survivors of sexual assault and domestic violence in Native American communities. She has been credited for her "instrumental role" in the 2013 reauthorization of the Violence Against Women Act, as well as for testimony which is credited with the 2010 passage of the Tribal Law and Order Act. Deer coauthored, with Bonnie Claremont, Amnesty International's 2007 report Maze of Injustice, documenting sexual assault against Native American women.She is also Chief Justice for the Prairie Island Indian Community Court of Appeals.  Deer adovocates for feminism, queer, and trans politics amidst Indigenous Reservations and local communites that are resilent towards these social movements.  She is most acknowledged for her social activites to stop violence against Native American Women. She has received national awards from the Department of Justice and the American Bar Association for her accomplishments. 

Deer received her B.A. and J.D. from the University of Kansas.

She is a citizen of the Muscogee (Creek) Nation.

Bibliography

Books

Articles 

 Deer, Sarah, Toward an Indigenous Jurisprudence of Rape (2010-10-13). Kansas Journal of Law & Public Policy, Vol. 14, 2004–2005.

References

External links
 Profile at William Mitchell
 Maze of Injustice 

1972 births
Living people
21st-century American lawyers
21st-century Native Americans
Hamline University faculty
Muscogee (Creek) Nation people
MacArthur Fellows
Native American lawyers
Place of birth missing (living people)
University of Kansas School of Law alumni
University of Kansas alumni
21st-century American women lawyers
21st-century Native American women
American women academics
20th-century Native Americans
20th-century Native American women